"Never Ricking Morty" is the sixth episode of the fourth season of the Adult Swim animated television series Rick and Morty. Written by Jeff Loveness and directed by Erica Hayes, the episode was broadcast on May 3, 2020 in the United States and on May 7, 2020 in the United Kingdom.

Plot 

Rick and Morty find themselves aboard the Story Train, a literal story device for an anthology episode featuring passengers telling each other tales about Rick. After killing the train's ticket taker, using a "continuity explosion" to find a map of the train, and fabricating a story that passes the Bechdel test, the two reach the train's engine room. There they confront Story Lord, who beats and captures them with the intent of using their "story potential" to power the train enough to take it beyond the fifth wall. They experience various possible futures, culminating in Rick and Morty facing an army of Meeseeks, Gazorpazorpian males, and robotic Ricks commanded by President Morty and a now-evil Mr. Poopybutthole. Rick averts the battle by having himself and Morty give their lives to Jesus. The anticlimax slows Story Train to a halt, causing Story Lord to angrily enter the potential future, after which Jesus himself appears. Rick and Morty use the literal deus ex machina to escape back onto Story Train and strand Story Lord in "every writer's hell: the Bible." When they try to return home, however, Rick discovers the train control panel is fake, and it's revealed that Story Train is a model train operating inside the Smith household. After Story Lord explains the nature of their reality and the origins of the tetragrammaton to Jesus, he breaks the toy. Rick chastises Morty to buy another one, arguing that "Nobody's out there shopping with this fucking virus."

In the post-credits scene, a toy commercial for "The Citadel of Ricks Story Train" plays out, which includes the Jesus and Story Lord characters and the Story Train Rick and Morty.

Production and writing 
In July 2019, Paul Giamatti was cast in an undisclosed role on a then-upcoming season 4 episode of Rick and Morty. In May 2020, Giamatti was revealed to be voicing the Story Lord, alongside Christopher Meloni as Jesus Christ. The episode, revealed to be titled "Never Ricking Morty", was directed by Erica Hayes and written by Jeff Loveness.

Reception

Broadcast and ratings 
The episode was broadcast by Adult Swim on May 3, 2020. According to Nielsen Media Research, "Never Ricking Morty" was seen by 1.55 million household viewers in the United States and received a 0.87 rating among the 18–49 adult demographic.

Critical response 
Steve Greene of IndieWire gave it an "A−" rating, complimented the episode's use of an extra-strength dose of self-awareness to grapple with the show's future.

Tom Reimann of Collider awarded the episode with a 3 star rating out of 5, writing that the episode:

References

External links 
 

2020 American television episodes
Metafictional television episodes
Portrayals of Jesus on television
Rick and Morty episodes
Works by Jeff Loveness